The Seychelles crow (Euploea mitra) is a species of nymphalid butterfly in the Danainae subfamily. It is endemic to the Seychelles, where it is only found on the islands of Mahe and Silhouette.

References

External links
Seitz, A. Die Gross-Schmetterlinge der Erde 13: Die Afrikanischen Tagfalter. Plate XIII 25

Fauna of Seychelles
Euploea
Endemic fauna of Seychelles
Butterflies described in 1857
Taxonomy articles created by Polbot